Unique Forms of Continuity in Space is a 1913 bronze Futurist sculpture by Umberto Boccioni. It is seen as an expression of movement and fluidity. The sculpture is depicted on the obverse of the Italian-issue 20 cent euro coin.

History
The Futurist movement was striving to portray speed and forceful dynamism in their art. Boccioni, though trained as a painter, began sculpting in 1912. He exclaimed that "these days I am obsessed by sculpture! I believe I have glimpsed a complete renovation of that mummified art." The following year Boccioni completed the sculpture. His goal for the work was to depict a "synthetic continuity" of motion instead of an "analytical discontinuity" that he saw in artists like František Kupka and Marcel Duchamp. In 1912–13 Boccioni created several other sculptures including his 1913 Development of a Bottle in Space.

Composition
Unique Forms of Continuity in Space depicts a human-like figure apparently in motion. The sculpture has an aerodynamic and fluid form. As a pedestal, two blocks at the feet connect the figure to the ground. The figure is also armless and without a discernibly real face. The form was originally inspired by the sight of a football player moving on to a perfectly weighted pass.

Though Boccioni apparently reviled traditional sculpture, Unique Forms of Continuity in Space does resemble more realist works. It is reminiscent of the classical Winged Victory of Samothrace, which Filippo Marinetti, founder of Futurism, declared was inferior in beauty to a roaring car. The lack of arms also pays homage to Auguste Rodin's Walking Man.

Original plaster and casts

Boccioni's work was in plaster, and was never cast into bronze in his lifetime. His original plaster is displayed at the Museu de Arte Contemporânea in São Paulo. Two bronze casts were made in 1931, one of which is displayed at the Museum of Modern Art in Manhattan. Two more were made in 1949, one of which is displayed at the Metropolitan Museum of Art in New York and other one at the Museum of Twentieth Century in Milan. Two also were made in 1972, one of which is displayed at the Tate Modern in London. Another eight, in 1972, were made not from the plaster original, but from one of the 1949 bronze casts. One bronze cast is in the Kröller-Müller Museum in Otterlo, Netherlands. In 2014, a bronze was donated to the National Gallery of Cosenza.

Influence

In 2009 Italian composer Carlo Forlivesi in collaboration with Stefano Fossati, Director of the Italian Cultural Institute in Melbourne, created an international composition competition and workshop titled Unique Forms of Continuity in Space (Forme Uniche della Continuità nello Spazio), commemorating the hundredth anniversary of Italian Futurism. With a name which brings to mind Boccioni's piece, the initiative, organised on an annual basis, celebrates the power of musical composition mingled with the strength of the Italian language. The international composition competition and workshop Unique Forms of Continuity in Space aims to contribute to the creation of a large and eclectic body of art works, with particular significance for the relationship between music and poetry.

In 2018, the sculpture was used as the basis of the trophy presented to the winner of the virtual Gran Turismo World Series sim racing competition held in the Gran Turismo series of racing games. The sculpture was chosen because it represents the surprise and fascination of machines discovered in the beginning of the 20th century, and shares values with Gran Turismo. Polyphony Digital, the creators of the Gran Turismo series, used laser scanning methods to create an accurate replication of the sculpture.

See also 
Antigrazioso

References

External links
Umberto Boccioni, a full text exhibition catalog from The Metropolitan Museum of Art, which contains material on this work

Futurist sculpture
1913 sculptures
Italian Futurism
Sculptures of the Museum of Modern Art (New York City)
Sculptures by Umberto Boccioni
Sculptures of the Metropolitan Museum of Art